Andrew Antonio Mendonça (born 9 July 2000) is a footballer who plays as a midfielder. Born in Angola, represented the Netherlands at several youth levels.

Club career
Born in Angola, Mendonça moved with his family to Lochem. He made his Eerste Divisie debut for Jong PSV on 13 January 2019 in a game against Jong Ajax, as a 59th-minute substitute for Justin Lonwijk.

References

External links
 

2000 births
Living people
Association football midfielders
Angolan footballers
Angolan emigrants to the Netherlands
Naturalised citizens of the Netherlands
Dutch footballers
Footballers from Gelderland
People from Lochem
Dutch people of Angolan descent
Netherlands youth international footballers
Eerste Divisie players
Jong PSV players
21st-century Dutch people
21st-century Angolan people